Multiple/dual citizenship (or multiple/dual nationality) is a legal status in which a person is concurrently regarded as a national or citizen of more than one country under the laws of those countries. Conceptually, citizenship is focused on the internal political life of the country and nationality is a matter of international dealings. There is no international convention which determines the nationality or citizenship status of a person. This is defined exclusively by national laws, which can vary and conflict with each other. Multiple citizenship arises because different countries use different, and not necessarily mutually exclusive, criteria for citizenship. Colloquially, people may "hold" multiple citizenship but, technically, each nation makes a claim that a particular person is considered its national.

A person holding multiple citizenship is, generally, entitled to the rights of citizenship in each country whose citizenship they are holding (such as right to a passport, right to enter the country, right to work, right to own property,  right to vote, etc.), but may also be subject to obligations of citizenship (such as a potential obligation for national service, becoming subject to taxation on worldwide income, etc.).

Some countries do not permit dual citizenship or only do in certain cases (e.g. inheriting multiple nationalities at birth). This may be by requiring an applicant for naturalization to renounce all existing citizenship, or by withdrawing its citizenship from someone who voluntarily acquires another citizenship, or by other devices. Some countries permit a renunciation of citizenship, while others do not. Some countries permit a general dual citizenship while others permit dual citizenship but only of a limited number of countries.

A country that allows dual citizenship may still not recognize the other citizenship of its nationals within its own territory (for example, in relation to entry into the country, national service, duty to vote, etc.). Similarly, it may not permit consular access by another country for a person who is also its national. Some countries prohibit dual citizenship holders from serving in their armed forces or on police forces or holding certain public offices.

History 
Up until the late 19th century, nations often decided whom they claimed as their citizens or subjects, and did not recognize any other nationalities they held. Many states did not recognize the right of their citizens to renounce their citizenship without permission, due to policies that originated with the feudal theory of perpetual allegiance to the sovereign. This meant that people could hold multiple citizenships, with none of their nations recognizing any other of their citizenships. Until the early modern era, when levels of migration were insignificant, this was not a serious issue. However, when non-trivial levels of migration began, this state of affairs sometimes led to international incidents, with countries of origin refusing to recognize the new nationalities of natives who had migrated, and when possible, conscripting natives who had naturalized as citizens of another country into military service. The most notable example was the War of 1812, triggered by British impressment into naval service of American seamen who were alleged to be British subjects.

In the aftermath of the 1867 Fenian Rising, Irish-Americans who had gone to Ireland to participate in the uprising and were caught were charged with treason, as the British authorities considered them to be British subjects. This outraged many Irish-Americans, to which the British responded by pointing out that, just like British law, American law also recognized perpetual allegiance. As a result, Congress passed the Expatriation Act of 1868, which granted Americans the right to freely renounce their U.S. citizenship. Britain followed suit with a similar law, and years later, signed a treaty agreeing to treat British subjects who had become U.S. citizens as no longer holding British nationality. During this time, diplomatic incidents had also arisen between the United States and several other European countries over their tendency to conscript naturalized American citizens visiting their former homelands. In response, the US government negotiated agreements with various European states known as the Bancroft Treaties, under which the signatories pledged to treat the voluntary naturalization of a former citizen or national with another sovereign nation as a renunciation of their citizenship.

As a result, the theory of perpetual allegiance largely fell out of favor with governments during the late 19th century. With the consensus of the time being that dual citizenship would only lead to diplomatic problems, more governments began prohibiting it and revoking the nationality of citizens holding another nationality. By the mid-20th century, dual nationality was largely prohibited worldwide, although there were exceptions. For example, a series of U.S. Supreme Court rulings permitted Americans born with citizenship in another country to keep it without losing their U.S. citizenship.

At the 1930 League of Nations Codification Conference, an attempt was made to codify nationality rules into a universal worldwide treaty, the 1930 Hague Convention, whose chief aims would be to completely abolish both statelessness and dual citizenship. The 1930 Convention on Certain Questions Relating to the Conflict of Nationality Laws proposed laws that would have reduced both, but in the end, was ratified by only twenty nations.

However, the consensus against dual nationality began to erode due to changes in social mores and attitudes. By the late 20th century it was becoming gradually accepted again. Many states were lifting restrictions on dual citizenship. For example, the British Nationality Act 1948 removed restrictions on dual citizenship in the United Kingdom, the 1967 Afroyim v. Rusk ruling by the U.S. Supreme Court prohibited the U.S. government from stripping citizenship from Americans who had dual citizenship without their consent, and the Canadian Citizenship Act, 1976, removed restrictions on dual citizenship in Canada. The number of states allowing multiple citizenships further increased after a treaty in Europe requiring signatories to limit dual citizenship lapsed in the 1990s, and countries with high emigration rates began permitting it to maintain links with their respective diasporas.

Citizenship of multiple countries 

Each country sets its own criteria for citizenship and the rights of citizenship, which change from time to time, often becoming more restrictive. For example, until 1982 a person born in the UK was automatically a British citizen; this was subjected to restrictions from 1983. These laws may create situations where a person may satisfy the citizenship requirements of more than one country simultaneously. This would, in the absence of laws of one country or the other, allow the person to hold multiple citizenships. National laws may include criteria as to the circumstances, if any, in which a person may concurrently hold another citizenship. A country may withdraw its own citizenship if a person acquires a citizenship of another country, for example:
 Citizenship by descent (jus sanguinis). Historically, citizenship was traced through the father, but today most countries permit the tracing through either parent and some also through a grandparent. Today, the citizenship laws of most countries are based on jus sanguinis. In many cases, this basis for citizenship also extends to children born outside the country, and sometimes even when the parent has lost citizenship.
 Citizenship by birth on the country's territory (jus soli). The United States, Canada, and many Latin American countries grant unconditional birthright citizenship. To stop birth tourism, most countries have abolished it; while Australia, France, Germany, Ireland, New Zealand, South Africa, and the United Kingdom have a modified jus soli, which requires at least one parent to be a citizen of the country (jus sanguinis) or a legal permanent resident who has lived in the country for several years. In the majority of such countries—for example, in Canada—children born to diplomats and under people outside the jurisdiction of the soil are not granted citizenship at birth. It is usually conferred automatically on the children once one of the parents obtain citizenship.
 Citizenship by marriage (jus matrimonii). Some countries routinely give citizenship to spouses of its citizens or may shorten the time for naturalization, but only in a few countries is citizenship granted on the wedding day (e.g., Iran). Some countries have regulations against so-called sham marriages (e.g., the United States), and some revoke the spouse's citizenship if the marriage terminates within a specified time (e.g., Algeria).
 Citizenship by naturalization.
 Citizenship by adoption. A minor adopted from another country when at least one adoptive parent is a citizen.
 Citizenship by investment. Some countries give citizenship to people who make a substantial monetary investment in their country. There are two countries in the European Union where this is possible: Malta and Cyprus; as well as the five Caribbean countries of Antigua and Barbuda,  Grenada, Dominica, St. Kitts & Nevis, and St. Lucia. Additionally the countries of Vanuatu, Montenegro, Turkey and Jordan offer citizenship by investment programs. Most of these countries grant citizenship immediately, provided that due diligence is passed, without a requirement for any physical presence in the country. Malta requires 1 year of residency before citizenship can be given. Portugal offers a permanent residence program by investment, but there is a 5-year timeline with periodic short visits in order to be eligible to obtain citizenship. Cambodia has laws enacted that allow foreigners to obtain citizenship through investment, but it is difficult to receive without fluency in Khmer. The countries of Comoros, Nauru, Kiribati, Marshall Islands, Tonga and Moldova previously had citizenship by investment programs; however, these programs have been suspended or discontinued. 
 Some countries grant citizenship based on ethnicity and on religion: Israel gives all Jews the right to immigrate to Israel, by the Law of Return, and fast-tracked citizenship. Dual citizenship is permitted, but when entering the country, the Israeli passport must be used.
 Citizenship by holding an office (jus officii). In the case of Vatican City, citizenship is based on holding an office, with Vatican citizenship held by the Pope, cardinals residing in Vatican City, active members of the Holy See's diplomatic service, and other directors of Vatican offices and services. Vatican citizenship is lost when the term of office comes to an end, and children cannot inherit it from their parents. Since Vatican citizenship is time-limited, dual citizenship is allowed, and persons who would become stateless because of loss of Vatican citizenship automatically become Italian citizens.

Once a country bestows citizenship, it may or may not consider a voluntary renunciation of that citizenship to be valid. In the case of naturalization, some countries require applicants for naturalization to renounce their former citizenship. For example, the United States Chief Justice John Rutledge ruled "a man may, at the same time, enjoy the rights of citizenship under two governments", but the United States requires applicants for naturalization to swear to an oath renouncing all prior "allegiance and fidelity" to any other nation or sovereignty as part of the naturalization ceremony. However, some countries do not recognise one of its citizens renouncing their citizenship. Effectively, the person in question may still possess both citizenships, notwithstanding the technical fact that he or she may have explicitly renounced one of the country's citizenships before officials of the other. For example, the United Kingdom recognises a renunciation of citizenship only if it is done with competent UK authorities. Consequently, British citizens naturalized in the United States remain British citizens in the eyes of the British government even after they renounce British allegiance to the satisfaction of United States authorities.

Irish nationality law applies to "the island of Ireland", which extends citizenship to Northern Ireland, which is part of the United Kingdom. Therefore, anyone born in Northern Ireland who meets the requirements for being an Irish citizen through birth on the "island of Ireland" (or a child born outside Ireland but with a qualifying parent) can exercise rights accorded only to Irish citizens, including that of traveling under an Irish passport. Under Irish law, even that such a person has not acted in this way does not necessarily mean that they are not entitled to Irish citizenship. (See Irish nationality law and British nationality law.) People born in Northern Ireland are  British citizens from birth  on the same basis as people born elsewhere in the UK. People born in Northern Ireland may generally choose to hold a British passport, an Irish passport, or both.

Multiple citizenship avoided 
Some countries may take measures to avoid creation of multiple citizenship. Since a country has control only over who has its citizenship, but has no control over who has any other country's citizenship, the only way for a country to avoid multiple citizenship is to deny its citizenship to people in cases when they would have another citizenship. This may take the following forms:

 Automatic loss of citizenship if another citizenship is acquired voluntarily, such as Austria, Azerbaijan, Bahrain, China (with the exception of Hong Kong and Macau, which allow multiple citizenship in parallel with Chinese citizenship, but prevent consular protection of the involved nation in their own and also in Mainland China),  India, Indonesia, Japan, Kazakhstan, Malaysia, Nepal and Singapore. Saudi Arabian citizenship may be withdrawn if a Saudi citizen obtains a foreign citizenship without the permission of the Prime Minister. In Brazil and The Netherlands, which have some exceptions to dual citizenship's admission, such loss, in practice, isn't automatic and may depend on the knowledge and the initiative of the Executive Power to take place.
 Possible (but not automatic) loss of citizenship if another citizenship is acquired voluntarily, such as South Africa.
 Possible (but not automatic) loss of citizenship if people with multiple citizenships do not renounce their other citizenships after reaching the age of majority or within a certain period of time after obtaining multiple citizenships, such as Indonesia, Japan and Montenegro (where such loss is automatic, but with some exceptions).
 Denying automatic citizenship by birth if the child may acquire another citizenship automatically at birth.
 Requiring applicants for naturalization to apply to renounce their existing citizenship(s) and provide proof from those countries that they have renounced the citizenship.

Automatic citizenship 
Countries may bestow citizenship automatically (i.e., "by operation of law"), which may result in multiple citizenships, in the following situations:
 Some countries automatically bestow citizenship on a person whose parent holds that country's citizenship. If they have different citizenships or are multiple citizens themselves, the child may gain multiple citizenships, depending on whether and how jus soli and jus sanguinis apply for each citizenship.
 Some countries (e.g., Canada, the United States of America and many other countries in the Americas) regard all children born there automatically to be eligible to be citizens (jus soli) even if the parents are not legally present. For example, a child born in the United States to Austrian parents automatically has dual citizenship with the United States and Austria, even though Austria usually restricts or forbids dual citizenship. There are exceptions, such as the child of a foreign diplomat living in the United States. Such a child would be eligible to become a lawful permanent resident, but not a citizen-based on the U.S. birth.This has led to birth tourism, so some countries have abolished jus soli or restricted it (i.e., at least one parent must be a citizen or a legal, permanent resident who has lived in the country for several years). Some countries forbid their citizens to renounce their citizenship or try to discourage them from doing so.
  Changes in the political status of a nation can render its people involuntary holders of citizenship from multiple countries.For example, if a belligerent state were to successfully invade another sovereign nation, seize and occupy that nation’s territory by force, control the movement of people in that territory, and then declare all residents of occupied territory to be citizens of the occupying state.

Complex laws on dual citizenship 

Some countries have special rules relating to multiple citizenships, such as:
 Some countries allow dual citizenship, but restrict the rights of dual citizens:
 in Egypt and Armenia, dual citizens cannot be elected to Parliament.
 in Israel, diplomats and members of Parliament must renounce any other citizenship before assuming their job.
 in Colombia, dual citizens cannot be Ministers of foreign affairs and of defense. 
 in Australia, dual citizens cannot be elected to federal Parliament. In the 2017–18 Australian parliamentary eligibility crisis, fifteen members of Parliament were found to have been ineligible for election due to holding another citizenship, although most had not been aware of the fact. In many instances, the affected members of Parliament subsequently renounced any other citizenships, before contesting again in subsequent by-elections (that were triggered by their own prior ineligibility) or general elections.
 in New Zealand, dual citizens may be elected to Parliament, but MPs once elected may not voluntarily become a citizen of another country, or take any action to have their foreign nationality recognised such as applying for a foreign passport. However, the only person to recently violate this, Harry Duynhoven, was protected by the passage of retroactive law.
 in the Philippines, dual citizens cannot run for any local elective office.
 in the independent states of the Commonwealth Caribbean, nationals of any Commonwealth country who meet local residency requirements are eligible to vote in elections and run for parliament, with one complicated caveat. Each of those countries has a provision barring anyone who "is by virtue of his own act, under any acknowledgment of allegiance, obedience or adherence to a foreign power or state" (to quote a representative provision from the constitution of St Vincent and the Grenadines) from becoming a member of parliament. The precise meaning of those provisions is disputed, and is the subject of separate ongoing legal disputes in the countries.
 in Kenya, dual citizens may not be elected or appointed to any state office or serve in the armed forces unless their second citizenship was obtained involuntarily, without the ability to opt out.
 Germany and Austria permit dual citizenship only for persons who had obtained another citizenship by birth. Germans and Austrians can apply for special permission to keep their citizenship (Beibehaltungsgenehmigung) before taking a second one (for example, both Austria and the United States consider Arnold Schwarzenegger a citizen). In general, however, any Austrian who takes up second citizenship will automatically lose Austrian citizenship. Since August 2007, Germany has recognised dual citizenship if the other citizenship is either one of an EU member country or Swiss citizenship so that permission is not required anymore in these cases, and in some exceptional cases, non-EU and non-Swiss citizens can keep their old citizenship when they become citizens of Germany. For more details, see . Due to changes of the German law on dual citizenship, children of non-EU legal permanent residents can have dual citizenship if they were born and grew up in Germany (the foreign-born parents usually cannot have dual citizenship themselves).
 Acquisition of the nationality of Andorra, France, Portugal, the Philippines, Equatorial Guinea or Iberoamerican countries, is not sufficient to cause the loss of Spanish nationality by birth. Spain has dual citizenship treaties with Argentina, Bolivia, Chile, Colombia, Costa Rica, the Dominican Republic, Ecuador, Honduras, Guatemala, Nicaragua, Paraguay, Peru, Puerto Rico, and Venezuela; Spaniards residing in these countries or territories do not lose their rights as Spaniards if they adopt that nationality. For all other countries, Spanish citizenship is lost three years after the acquisition of the foreign citizenship unless the individual declares officially their will to retain Spanish citizenship (Spanish nationality law). Upon request Spain has allowed persons from Puerto Rico to acquire Spanish citizenship. On the other hand, foreign nationals who acquire Spanish nationality must relinquish their previous nationality, unless they are natural-born citizens of an Iberoamerican country, Andorra, the Philippines, Equatorial Guinea or Portugal even if these countries do not grant their citizens a similar treatment, or Sephardi Jews. See also the section on "dormant" citizenship.
 Prior to 2011, South Korea did not permit multiple nationalities and for such a  person, the nationality was stripped after that person becoming the age of 22. Since 2011, a person can hold multiple nationalities if he or she has a multiple nationalities by birthright (i.e. not by naturalization) and explicitly takes an oath not to exercise the other nationality inside the jurisdiction of South Korea. For details, see .
 Like Germany and Austria, citizens of South Africa must apply for permission to keep their citizenship when acquiring the citizenship of another country.
 Turkey requires Turkish citizens who apply for another nationality to inform Turkish officials (the nearest Turkish embassy or consulate abroad) and provide the original naturalization certificate, Turkish birth certificate, marriage certificate (if applicable) and two photographs. Dual nationals are not compelled to use a Turkish passport to enter and leave Turkey; it is permitted to travel with a valid foreign passport and the Turkish national ID card.
 Pakistan allows dual citizenship on an inclusionary basis since 1951 with 20 countries: Australia, Bahrain, Belgium, Canada, Denmark, Egypt, Finland, France, Germany, Iceland, Ireland, Italy, Jordan, the Netherlands, New Zealand, Sweden, Switzerland, Syria, the United Kingdom, and the United States.
 In contrast, Bangladesh allows dual citizenship on an exclusionary basis - only with Non-Resident Bangladeshis who are not previously citizens of SAARC countries.
In Poland a Polish citizen, who is a dual national of another country, is legally treated in the same way as a Polish citizen with one nationality. He cannot exercise additional rights and duties that come from his second citizenship in relation to the Polish government. However, submitting a passport of another country to the border guards is not forbidden and there are no penalties in the law. If the citizen does so, he is going to be treated as a citizen of another country. However, when the border guards find out, that the person has also Polish citizenship, they are going to treat him as a Polish citizen only and he is not going to be able to leave (or enter) Poland only using his foreign passport. Since then, he is obliged to show them his Polish passport.    
The same principle as Poland is enforced in France, but when being in one of the country they're citizen of, the plural-national isn't allowed to request French consular help. For example, a citizen of both France and Italy, they can't request help from French consulate in Italy and they can't request Italian consular help in France.

Partial citizenship, and residency

Many countries allow foreigners or former citizens to live and work indefinitely there. However, for voting, being voted and working for the public sector or the national security in a country, citizenship of the country concerned is almost always required.

 Since 2008, Poland has granted the "Polish Card" (Karta Polaka) to ethnic Poles who can prove they have Polish ancestors and knowledge of the Polish language and declare their Polish ethnicity in written form. Holders of the Card are not regarded as citizens, but enjoy some privileges other foreigners do not, e.g. entry visa, right to work, education, or healthcare in Poland. As stated above, Poland currently has no specific laws on dual citizenship; second citizenship is tolerated, but not recognized.
 Turkey allows its citizens to have dual citizenship if they inform the authorities before acquiring the second citizenship (see above), and former Turkish citizens who have given up their Turkish citizenship (for example, because they have naturalized in a country that usually does not permit dual citizenship, such as Germany, Austria or the Netherlands) can apply for the "Blue Card" (Mavi Kart), which gives them some citizens' rights back, e.g. the right to live and work in Turkey, the right to possess land or the right to inherit, but not, for example, the right to vote.
 Overseas citizenship of India: The Constitution of India does not permit dual citizenship or dual nationality, except for minors where the second nationality was involuntarily acquired. Indian authorities interpreted this to mean a person cannot have another country's passport while simultaneously holding an Indian one, even for a child claimed by another country as its citizen, who may be required by the laws of this country to use the corresponding passports for foreign travel (such as a child born in the United States to Indian parents). Indian courts have given the executive branch wide discretion over this matter.
 In 2005, India amended the 1955 Citizenship Act to introduce a form of overseas citizenship, which stops just short of full dual citizenship and is, in all aspects, like permanent residency. Such overseas citizens are exempt from the rule forbidding dual citizenship; they may not vote, run for office, join the army, or take up government posts, though these evolving principles are subject to revolving political discretions  for those born in India with birthrights. Moreover, people who have acquired citizenship in Pakistan or Bangladesh are not eligible for overseas citizenship.
 Many countries (e.g. United States, Canada, all EU countries and Switzerland, South Africa, Australia, New Zealand, and Singapore) issue permanent residency status to foreigners deemed eligible. This status generally authorises a person to live and work in the issuing country indefinitely. There is not always any right to vote in the host country, and there may be other restrictions (no consular protection) and rights (not subject to military conscription). Permanent residents may usually apply for citizenship after several years of residency. Depending both on the home country and the guest country, dual citizenship may or may not be permitted.
 Some countries have concluded treaties regulating travel and access to employment: A citizen of an EU country can live and work indefinitely in other EU countries and the four EFTA countries, and citizens of the EFTA countries can live and work in EU countries. Such EU citizens can vote in EU, but not national or local, elections. The Trans-Tasman Travel Arrangement between Australia and New Zealand allows their citizens to live and work in the other country. A citizen of a GCC member state (Bahrain, Kuwait, Oman, Qatar, Saudi Arabia, and United Arab Emirates) can live and work in other member states, but dual citizenship (even with another GCC state) is not allowed. Indian citizens do not need a visa to travel to and work in Nepal or Bhutan (and vice versa), but none of the three countries allow dual citizenship.

Multiple citizenship "not recognized" 

A statement that a country "does not recognize" multiple citizenship is confusing and ambiguous. Often, it is simply a restatement of the Master Nationality Rule, whereby a country treats a person who is a citizen of both that country and another in the same way as one who is a citizen only of the country. In other words, the country "does not recognize" that the person has any other citizenship for the purposes of the country's laws. In particular, citizens of a country may not be permitted to use another country's passport or travel documents to enter or leave the country, or be entitled to consulate assistance from the other country.  Also, the dual national may be subject to compulsory military service in countries where they are considered to be nationals.

"Dormant" citizenship and "right of return" 

The concept of a "dormant citizenship" means that a person has the citizenships of two countries, but as long as while living permanently in one country, their status and citizen's rights in the other country are "inactive". They will be "reactivated" when they move back to live permanently in the other country. This means, in spite of dual citizenship, only one citizenship can be exercised at a time.

The "dormant citizenship" exists, for example, in Spain: Spanish citizens who have naturalized in an Iberoamerican country and have kept their Spanish citizenship are dual citizens, but have lost many of the rights of Spanish citizens resident in Spain—and hence the EU—until they move back to Spain. Some countries offer former citizens or citizens of former colonies of the country a simplified (re-)naturalization process. Depending on the laws of the two countries in question, dual citizenship may or may not be allowed. For details, see "right of return".

Another example of "dormant citizenship" (or "hidden citizenship") occurs when a person is automatically born a citizen of another country without officially being recognized. In many cases, the person may even be unaware that he holds multiple citizenship. For example, due to Italy's nationality law, a person born in Canada to parents of Italian ancestry may be born with both Canadian and Italian citizenship at birth. Canadian citizenship is automatically acquired by birth within Canada. However, that same person may also acquire Italian citizenship at birth if at least one parent's lineage traces to back to an Italian citizen. The person, their parent, grandparent, great-grandparent, and great-great-grandparent may have all transmitted the Italian citizenship to the next child in the line without even knowing it. Therefore, even if the person in this case may have been four generations removed from the last Italian-born (and therefore recognized) citizen, the great-great-grandparent, he would still be born with Italian citizenship. Even though the person may not even be aware of the citizenship, it doesn't change the fact that he is a citizen since birth. Therefore, the second citizenship (in this case, the Italian citizenship) is "dormant" (or "hidden") due to the fact that the person does not even know he is a citizen and/or does not have official recognition from the country's government. That person would therefore have to gather all necessary documents and present them to the Italian government so that their "dormant" or "hidden" citizenship will be recognized. Once it's recognized, he will be able to do all of the things that any citizen could do, such as apply for a passport.

Multiple citizenship encouraged 

Some countries are more open to multiple citizenship than others, as it may help citizens travel and conduct business overseas. Countries that have taken active steps towards permitting multiple citizenship in recent years include Switzerland (since January 1, 1992) and Australia (since April 4, 2002).

Today, most advanced economies allow dual citizenship; notable exceptions which restrict or forbid it are Austria, Japan, the Netherlands, and Singapore. Of the newly industrialized countries, Brazil (with rare exceptions), Mexico, the Philippines, South Africa (with prior permission), Thailand, and Turkey (with prior permission) allow dual citizenship, while China (although Permanent Residents of Hong Kong and Macau may concurrently hold foreign passports), India, and Malaysia forbid it. Indonesia allows dual citizenship only until the age of 18 years.

In former times, most countries on the American continent advertised their policy of unconditional birthright citizenship to become more attractive for immigrants. Despite wide acceptance of dual citizenship, industrialized countries (Canada and the United States) now try to protect themselves from birth tourism and uncontrollable immigration waves. Most of these countries still grant unconditional birthright citizenship (even for children of illegal immigrants). There have been some calls to change the laws, but, so far, they have not been successful. Brazil has such policies; the only people born in Brazil who do not automatically acquire Brazilian citizenship are those whose parents are residing in Brazil while serving their own countries (as diplomats, military attachés, cultural attachés and the like).

In Australia, France, Germany, Ireland, New Zealand, South Africa, and the UK, a child born there is regarded as a citizen only if at least one parent is either a citizen or a legal permanent resident who has lived there for several years. (Germany usually restricts dual citizenship, so non-EU/non-Swiss citizens born and grown up abroad must usually renounce their old citizenship when naturalizing.) Some countries (e.g. Liechtenstein) allow only citizens by descent to have dual citizenship, but require naturalized citizens to renounce their old citizenship.

Subnational citizenship 
 Under the Fourteenth Amendment to the United States Constitution, all persons born or naturalized in the United States, and subject to the jurisdiction thereof, are citizens of the United States . Certain rights accrue as an incident of state citizenship and access to federal courts can sometimes be determined on State citizenship. In addition, tribal sovereignty affords members ("citizens") of federally recognized tribes ("nations") a status comparable to local citizenship.
 Switzerland has a three-tier system of citizenship – Confederation, canton and commune (municipality).
 Although considered part of the United Kingdom for British nationality purposes, the Crown Dependencies of Jersey, Guernsey and the Isle of Man have local legislation restricting certain employment and housing rights to those with "local status". Although the British citizenship of people from these islands gives them full citizenship rights when in the United Kingdom, it did not give them the rights that British citizenship generally conferred prior to 2021 when in other parts of the European Union (for example, the right to reside and work). In a similar way, a number of British Overseas Territories have a concept of "belonger status" for their citizens, in addition to their existing British citizenship.
 Citizens of the People's Republic of China may be permanent residents of the Hong Kong or Macau Special Administrative Regions, or have household registration (hukou) somewhere in mainland China. School enrollment, work permission, and other civic rights and privileges (such as whether one may apply for a Hong Kong SAR passport, Macau SAR passport, or People's Republic of China passport) are tied to the region in which the citizen has permanent residence or household registration. Although within mainland China the hukou system has loosened in recent years, movement between Macau, Hong Kong, and the mainland remains controlled. Mainland Chinese who migrate to Hong Kong on one-way permits have their mainland hukou cancelled, while children born in Hong Kong to visiting mainland parents cannot receive mainland hukou unless they cancel their Hong Kong permanent residence status.
 People from Åland have joint regional (Åland) and national (Finnish) citizenship. People with Ålandic citizenship (hembygdsrätt) have the right to buy property and set up a business on Åland, but Finns without regional citizenship cannot. Finns can get Ålandic citizenship after living on the islands for five years, and Ålanders lose their regional citizenship after living on the Finnish mainland for five years.
 The territorial government of Puerto Rico began issuing Puerto Rican citizenship certificates in September 2007 after Juan Mari Brás, a lifelong supporter of independence, won a successful court victory that validated his claim that Puerto Rican citizenship was valid and can be claimed by anyone born on the island or with at least one parent who was born there.
 In Bosnia and Herzegovina, citizens hold also citizenship of their respective entity, generally that in which they reside. This citizenship can be of the Republika Srpska or of the Federation of Bosnia and Herzegovina. One must have citizenship of at least one, but cannot hold both entity citizenships simultaneously.
 In Malaysia, a federation of thirteen states, each state gives certain benefits such as baby bonus, education loans and scholarships to children born in the state (or born to parents who were born in the state) and/or residing in the state. The states of Sabah and Sarawak in East Malaysia each has its own immigration control and permanent residency system; citizens from Peninsular Malaysian states are subject to immigration control in the two states.
 People from the Cook Islands and Niue have New Zealand citizenship, along with a local status that is not extended to other New Zealanders.

Former instances 
 The use of internal passport to restrict residency and movement in the Soviet Union and in apartheid-era South Africa had the effect of tying local "citizens" to their assigned administrative entity (titular nations and bantustans, respectively).
 Following the federalization of Czechoslovakia in 1968, Czechoslovak citizens also possessed an internal citizenship of either Czechia or Slovakia. Upon the nation's peaceful dissolution in 1993, this was used to determine whether they ought to receive Czech or Slovak citizenship.
 Before the break-up of Yugoslavia in 1991, Yugoslav citizens possessed an internal citizenship of their own republic (Serbia, Croatia, Bosnia and Herzegovina, Slovenia, North Macedonia, Montenegro) as well as Yugoslav citizenship. In Serbia and Montenegro, this system was in effect until 2006.
 When Singapore joined Malaysia in 1963, all Singapore citizens were granted Malaysian citizenship. Singapore citizenship continued to exist as a subnational citizenship, and continued to be legislated by the Legislative Assembly of Singapore subject to the approval of the Parliament of Malaysia. Upon Singapore's independence from Malaysia in 1965, Malaysian citizenship was withdrawn from Singapore citizens, and all Singapore citizens became citizens of the new Republic of Singapore.
 The constitution of Jammu and Kashmir allowed on citizens of the state special privileges i.e. purchase of property, government jobs etc. However, the Government of India revoked article 370 in 2019, providing uniform status of citizenship across the entire nation.

Supra-national citizenship 
 In European Union law, there is the concept of EU citizenship which flows from the Maastricht treaty which created a legal identity for the European Community and granted citizenship to all current and future citizens of a member state. An EU citizen is free to live and to work in another EU country for an unlimited period of time, but member states may reserve the right to vote in national elections, stand for national election, become a public servant in highly sensitive ministries (Defence for example), etc. only for their citizens, and in highly limited circumstances, may deport or refuse entry to citizens of other EU states. An EU state may place restrictions on the free movement rights of citizens of newly admitted states for several years, such provisions remain in force mostly for nationals of Croatia (no later than 2020); in the past, and to a lesser extent, such provisions also affected Estonia, Latvia, Lithuania, Poland, the Czech Republic, Slovakia, Hungary, Slovenia, Bulgaria and Romania.
 The Nordic Passport Union, containing Denmark (including Faroe Islands and Greenland, unlike the EU), Sweden, Iceland, Norway (including Svalbard Islands) and Finland, allow citizens of members to travel across their borders without requiring Passports (just IDs), although this has previously been temporarily suspended in response to the European migrant crisis and the COVID-19 pandemic.  Citizens of members are often eligible for fast track processing to citizenships of other Members, with varying degrees of recognition/tolerance of dual citizenship among the states.
 The United Kingdom recognises a Commonwealth citizenship for the citizens of the member states of the Commonwealth of Nations. The United Kingdom allows non-nationals who are Commonwealth citizens to vote and stand for election while resident there, while most other Commonwealth countries make little or no distinction between citizens of other Commonwealth nations and citizens of non-Commonwealth nations.  Notably Commonwealth citizenship no longer imparts a right of residence in the UK.
 Commonwealth of Independent States nations (the republics of the former Soviet Union) are often eligible for fast track processing to citizenships of other CIS countries, with varying degrees of recognition/tolerance of dual citizenship among the states.

Effects and potential issues 
It is often observed that dual citizenship may strengthen ties between migrants and their countries of origin and increase their propensity to remit funds to their communities of origin.

Qualitative research on the impact of dual citizenship on the remittances, diaspora investments, return migration, naturalization and political behavior finds several ways in which multiple citizenship can affect these categories. As a bundle of rights, dual citizenship (a) enables dual citizens by granting special privileges, (b) affects their expectations about privileges in the decision-making process, and (c) eases the transaction process and reducing costs and risks, for example in the case of investing and conducting business. In addition, a dual legal status can have positive effects on diasporic identification and commitment to causes in the homeland, as well as to a higher naturalization rate of immigrants in their countries of residence.

National cohesiveness 

A study published in 2007 in The Journal of Politics explored questions of whether allowing dual citizenship impedes cultural assimilation or social integration, increases disconnection from the political process, and degrades national or civic identity/cohesiveness.

The rise in tension between mainstream and migrant communities is cited as evidence of the need to maintain a strong national identity and culture. They assert that the fact that a second citizenship can be obtained without giving anything up (such as the loss of public benefits, welfare, healthcare, retirement funds, and job opportunities in the country of origin in exchange for citizenship in a new country) both trivializes what it means to be a citizen and nullifies the consequential, transformational, and psychological change that occurs in an individual when they go through the naturalization process.

In effect, this approach argues, the self-centered taking of an additional citizenship contradicts what it means to be a citizen in that it becomes a convenient and painless means of attaining improved economic opportunity without any real consequences and can just as easily be discarded when it is no longer beneficial. Proponents argue that dual citizenship can actually encourage political activity providing an avenue for immigrants who are unwilling to forsake their country of origin either out of loyalty or due to a feeling of separation from the mainstream society because of language, culture, religion, or ethnicity.

A 2007 academic study concluded that dual citizens had a negative effect on the assimilation and political connectedness of first-generation Latino immigrants to the United States, finding dual citizens:

 32% less likely to be fluent in English
 18% less likely to identify as "American"
 19% less likely to consider the US as their homeland
 18% less likely to express high levels of civic duty
 9% less likely to register to vote
 15% less likely to have ever voted in a national election

The study also noted that although dual nationality is likely to disconnect immigrants from the American political system and impede assimilation, the initial signs suggest that these effects seem to be limited almost exclusively to the first generation (although it is mentioned that a full assessment of dual nationality beyond the first generation is not possible with present data).

Concern over the effect of multiple citizenship on national cohesiveness is generally more acute in the United States. The reason for this is twofold:
 The United States is a "civic" nation and not an "ethnic" nation. American citizenship is not based on belonging to a particular ethnicity, but on political loyalty to American democracy and values. Regimes based on ethnicity, which support the doctrine of perpetual allegiance as one is always a member of the ethnic nation, are not concerned with assimilating non-ethnics since they can never become true citizens. In contrast, the essence of a civic nation makes it imperative that immigrants assimilate into the greater whole as there is not an "ethnic" cohesiveness uniting the populace.
 The United States is an immigrant nation. As immigration is primarily directed at family reunification and refugee status rather than education and job skills, the pool of candidates tends to be poorer, less educated, and consistently from less stable countries (either non-democracies or fragile ones) with less familiarity or understanding of American values, making their assimilation both more difficult and more important.

The degree of angst over the effects of dual citizenship seemingly corresponds to a country's model for managing immigration and ethnic diversity:
 The differential exclusionary model, which accepts immigrants as temporary "guestworkers" but is highly restrictive with regard to other forms of immigration and to naturalisation of immigrants. Many countries in Asia such as Japan, China, Taiwan, Singapore and the countries of the Middle East tend to follow this approach.
 The assimilationist model, which accepts that immigrants obtain citizenship, but on the condition that they give up some or all cultural, linguistic, or social characteristics that differ from those of the majority population. Europe is the primary example of this model, where immigrants are usually required to learn the official language, and cultural traditions such as Islamic dress are often barred in public spaces (see Immigration to Europe). 
 The multicultural model, which grants immigrants access to citizenship and to equal rights without demanding that they give up cultural, linguistic, or intermarriage restrictions or otherwise pressure them to integrate or inter-mix with the mainstream population. Canada, Australia, New Zealand and the United States have historically taken this approach, as exemplified by the fact that the United States has no official language, allowing official documents such as election ballots to be printed in a variety of languages. (See Immigration to the United States.)

Appearance of foreign allegiance 

People with multiple citizenship may be viewed as having dual loyalty, having the potential to act contrary to a government's interests, and this may lead to difficulties in acquiring government employment where security clearance may be required.

In the United States, dual citizenship is associated with two categories of security concerns: foreign influence and foreign preference. Contrary to common misconceptions, dual citizenship in itself is not the major problem in obtaining or retaining security clearance in the United States. As a matter of fact, if a security clearance applicant's dual citizenship is "based solely on parents' citizenship or birth in a foreign country", that can be a mitigating condition. However, taking advantage of the entitlements of a non-US citizenship can cause problems. For example, possession or use of a foreign passport is a condition disqualifying one from security clearance and "is not mitigated by reasons of personal convenience, safety, requirements of foreign law, or the identity of the foreign country" as is explicitly clarified in a Department of Defense policy memorandum which defines a guideline requiring that "any clearance be denied or revoked unless the applicant surrenders the foreign passport or obtains official permission for its use from the appropriate agency of the United States Government".

This guideline has been followed in administrative rulings by the United States Department of Defense (DoD) Defense Office of Hearings and Appeals (DOHA) office of Industrial Security Clearance Review (ISCR), which decides cases involving security clearances for Contractor personnel doing classified work for all DoD components. In one such case, an administrative judge ruled that it is not clearly consistent with US national interest to grant a request for a security clearance to an applicant who was a dual national of the U.S. and Ireland, despite the fact that it has with good relations with the US.
In Israel, certain military units, including most recently the Israeli Navy's submarine fleet, as well as posts requiring high security clearances, require candidates to renounce any other citizenship before joining, though the number of units making such demands has declined. In many combat units, candidates are required to declare but not renounce any foreign citizenship.

On the other hand, Israel may view some dual citizens as desirable candidates for its security services due to their ability to legitimately enter neighbouring states which are closed to Israeli passport holders. The related case of Ben Zygier has caused debate about dual citizenship in Australia.

Multiple citizenship among politicians 
This perception of dual loyalty can apply even when the job in question does not require security clearance. In the United States, dual citizenship is common among politicians or government employees. For example, Arnold Schwarzenegger retained his Austrian citizenship during his service as a Governor of California while US Senator Ted Cruz renounced his Canadian citizenship birthright on May 14, 2014.

In 1999, the US Attorney General's office issued an official opinion that a statutory provision that required the Justice Department not to employ a non-"citizen of the United States" did not bar it from employing dual citizens.

In Germany, politicians can have dual citizenship. David McAllister, who holds British and German citizenship, was minister president of the State of Lower-Saxony from July 1, 2010, to February 19, 2013. He was the first German minister president to hold dual citizenship.

A small controversy arose in 2005 when Michaëlle Jean was appointed the Governor General of Canada (official representative of the Queen). Although Jean no longer holds citizenship in her native Haiti, her marriage to French-born filmmaker Jean-Daniel Lafond allowed her to obtain French citizenship several years before her appointment. Article 23-8 of the French civil code allows the French government to withdraw French nationality from French citizens holding government or military positions in other countries and Jean's appointment made her both de facto head of state and commander-in-chief of the Canadian forces. The French embassy released a statement that this law would not be enforced because the Governor General is essentially a ceremonial figurehead. Nevertheless, Jean renounced her French citizenship two days before taking up office to end the controversy about it.

However, former Canadian Prime Minister John Turner was born in the United Kingdom and still retained his dual citizenship. Stéphane Dion, former head of the Liberal Party of Canada and the previous leader of the official opposition, holds dual citizenship with France as a result of his mother's nationality; Dion nonetheless indicated a willingness to renounce French citizenship if a significant number of Canadians viewed it negatively. Thomas Mulcair, Leader of the New Democratic Party and former leader of Official Opposition in the Canadian House of Commons also holds dual citizenship with France.

In Egypt, dual citizens cannot be elected to Parliament.

The Constitution of Australia, in Section 44(i), explicitly forbids people who hold allegiance to foreign powers from sitting in the parliament of Australia. This restriction on people with dual or multiple citizenship being members of parliament does not apply to the state parliaments, and the regulations vary by state. A court case (see Sue v Hill) determined that the UK is a foreign power for purposes of this section of the constitution, despite Australia holding a common nationality with it at the time that the Constitution was written, and that Senator-elect Heather Hill had not been duly elected to the national parliament because at the time of her election she was a subject or citizen of a foreign power. However, the High Court of Australia also ruled that dual citizenship on its own would not be enough to disqualify someone from validly sitting in Parliament. The individual circumstances of the non-Australian citizenship must be looked at although the person must make a reasonable effort to renounce his or her non-Australian citizenship. However, if that other citizenship cannot be reasonably revoked (for example, if it is impossible under the laws of the other country or impossible in practice because it requires an extremely difficult revocation process), then that person will not be disqualified from sitting in Parliament. In the 2017 Australian parliamentary eligibility crisis, the High Court disqualified Australia's Deputy Prime Minister and four Senators because they held dual citizenship, despite being unaware of their citizenship status when elected.

In New Zealand, controversy arose in 2003 when Labour MP Harry Duynhoven applied to renew his citizenship of the Netherlands. Duynhoven, the New Zealand-born son of a Dutch-born father, had possessed dual citizenship from birth but had temporarily lost his Dutch citizenship due to a 1995 change in Dutch law regarding non-residents. While New Zealand's Electoral Act allowed candidates with dual citizenship to be elected as MPs, Section 55 of the Act stated that an MP who applied for citizenship of a foreign power after taking office would forfeit his/her seat. This was regarded by many as a technicality, however; and Duynhoven, with his large electoral majority, was almost certain to re-enter Parliament in the event of a by-election. As such, the Labour Government retrospectively amended the Act, thus enabling Duynhoven to retain his seat. The amendment, nicknamed "Harry's Law", was passed by a majority of 61 votes to 56. The revised Act allows exceptions to Section 55 on the grounds of an MP's country/place of birth, descent, or renewing a foreign passport issued before the MP took office.

Both the former Estonian president Toomas Hendrik Ilves and the former Lithuanian president Valdas Adamkus had been naturalized US citizens prior to assuming their offices. Both have renounced their US citizenships: Ilves in 1993 and Adamkus in 1998. This was necessary because neither individual's new country permits retention of a former citizenship. Adamkus was a high-ranking official in the Environmental Protection Agency, a federal government department, during his time in the United States. Former Latvian president Vaira Vīķe-Freiberga relinquished Canadian citizenship upon taking office in 1999.

Taxation 

In some cases, multiple citizenship can create additional tax liability. Almost all countries that impose tax normally base tax liability on source or residency. A very few countries tax their non-resident citizens on foreign income; examples include the United States, Eritrea, and the Philippines

 Residency: a country may tax the income of anyone who lives there, regardless of citizenship or whether the income was earned in that country or abroad (most common system);
 Source: a country may tax any income generated there, regardless of whether the earner is a citizen, resident, or non-resident; or
 Citizenship: a country may tax the worldwide income of its citizens, regardless of whether they reside in that country or whether the income was sourced there (as of 2012: only the United States and Eritrea). A few other countries tax based on citizenship in limited situations: Finland, France, Hungary, Italy, and Spain.

Under Spanish tax law, Spanish nationals and companies still have tax obligations with Spain if they move to a country that is in the list of tax havens and cannot justify a strong reason, beside tax evasion. They are required to be residents of that country for a minimum of 5 years; after which they are free from any tax obligations.

U.S. persons living outside the United States are still subject to tax on their worldwide income, although U.S. tax law provides measures to reduce or eliminate double taxation issues for some, namely exemption of earned income (up to an inflation-adjusted threshold which, as of 2020, is below $110,000), exemption of basic foreign housing, as well as foreign tax credits. It has been reported that some US citizens have relinquished US citizenship in order to avoid possible taxes, the expense and complexity of compliance, or because they have been deemed unacceptable to financial institutions in the wake of FATCA.

A person with multiple citizenship may have a tax liability to his country of residence and also to one or more of his countries of citizenship; or worse, if unaware that one of his citizenships created a tax liability, that country may consider the person to be a tax evader. Many countries and territories have signed tax treaties or agreements for avoiding double taxation.

Still, there are cases in which a person with multiple citizenship will owe tax solely on the basis of holding one such citizenship. For example, consider a person who holds both Australian and United States citizenship, lives and works in Australia. He would be subject to Australian taxation, because Australia taxes its residents, and he would be subject to U.S. taxation because he holds U.S. citizenship. In general, he would be allowed to subtract the Australian income tax he paid from the U.S. tax that would be due. In addition, the U.S. will allow some parts of foreign income to be exempt from taxation; for instance, in 2018 the foreign earned income exclusion allowed up to US$103,900 of foreign salaried income to be exempt from income tax (in 2020, this was increased to US$107,600). This exemption, plus the credit for foreign taxes paid mentioned above, often results in no U.S. taxes being owed, although a U.S. tax return would still have to be filed. In instances where the Australian tax was less than the U.S. tax, and where there was income that could not be exempted from U.S. tax, the U.S. would expect any tax due to be paid.

The United States Internal Revenue Service has excluded some regulations such as Alternative Minimum Tax (AMT) from tax treaties that protect double taxation.  In its current format even if U.S. citizens are paying income taxes at a rate of 56%, far above the maximum U.S. marginal tax rate, the citizen can be subject to US taxes because the calculation of the AMT does not allow full deduction for taxes paid to a foreign country. Other regulations such as the post date of foreign mailed tax returns are not recognized and can result in penalties for late filing if they arrive at the IRS later than the filing date. However, the filing date for overseas citizens has a two-month automatic extension to June 15.

"If you are a U.S. citizen or resident alien residing overseas, or are in the military on duty outside the U.S., on the regular due date of your return, you are allowed an automatic 2-month extension to file your return and pay any amount due without requesting an extension. For a calendar year return, the automatic 2-month extension is to June 15. If you are unable to file your return by the automatic 2-month extension date, you can request an additional extension to October 15 by filing Form 4868 before the automatic 2-month extension date. However, any tax due payments made after June 15 will be subject to both interest charges and failure to pay penalties." (IRS, 2012)

Issues with international travel 
Many countries, even those that permit multiple citizenship, do not explicitly recognise multiple citizenship under their laws: individuals are treated either as citizens of that country or not, and their citizenship with respect to other countries is considered to have no bearing. This can mean (in Iran, Mexico, many Arab countries, and former Soviet republics) that consular officials abroad may not have access to their citizens if they also hold local citizenship. Some countries provide access for consular officials as a matter of courtesy, but do not accept any obligation to do so under international consular agreements. The right of countries to act in this fashion is protected via the Master Nationality Rule.

Multiple citizens who travel to a country of citizenship are often required to enter or leave the country on that country's passport. For example, a United States Department of State web page on dual nationality contains the information that most US citizens, including dual nationals, must use a US passport to enter and leave the United States. Under the terms of the South African Citizenship Act, it is an offence for someone aged at least 18 with South African citizenship and another citizenship to enter or depart the Republic of South Africa using the passport of another country. Individuals who possess multiple citizenships, may also be required, before leaving a country of citizenship, to fulfill requirements ordinarily required of its resident citizens, including compulsory military service or exit permits. An example of this occurs in Israel, which permits multiple citizenships whilst also requiring compulsory military service for its citizens.

In accordance with the European Travel Information and Authorisation System (ETIAS), the EU citizens who have multiple nationalities will be obliged to use the passport issued by an EU Member State for entering the Schengen area.

Military service 
Military service for dual nationals can be an issue of concern. Several countries have entered into a Protocol relating to Military Obligations in Certain Cases of Double Nationality established at The Hague, 12 April 1930. The protocol states "A person possessing two or more nationalities who habitually resides in one of the countries whose nationality he possesses, and who is in fact most closely connected with that country, shall be exempt from all military obligations in the other country or countries. This exemption may involve the loss of the nationality of the other country or countries." The protocol has several provisions.

Healthcare
The right to healthcare in countries with a public health service is often discussed in relation to immigration but is a non-issue as far as nationality is concerned. The right to use public health services may be conditioned on nationality and/or on legal residency. For example, anyone legally resident and employed in the UK is entitled to use the National Health Service; non-resident British citizens visiting Britain do not have this right, unless they are UK state pensioners who hold a UK S1 form.

Dominant and effective nationality 
The potential issues that dual nationality can pose in international affairs has long been recognized, and as a result, international law recognizes the concept of "dominant and effective nationality", under which a dual national will hold only one dominant and effective nationality for the purposes of international law to one nation that holds their primary national allegiance, while any other nationalities are subordinate. The theory of dominant and effective nationality emerged as early as 1834. Customary international law and precedent have since recognized the idea of dominant and effective nationality, with the Nottebohm case providing an important shift. The International Court of Justice defines effective nationality as a "legal bond having as its basis a social fact of attachment, a genuine connection of existence, interests and sentiments, together with the existence of reciprocal rights and duties". International tribunals have adopted and used the principle. Under customary international law, tribunals dealing with questions involving dual nationality must determine the effective nationality of the dual national by determining to which nation the individual has more of a "genuine link". Unlike dual nationality, one may only be the effective national of a single nation, and different factors are taken into consideration to determine effective nationality, including habitual residence, family ties, financial and economic ties, cultural integration, participation in public life, armed forces service, and evidence of sentiment of national allegiance.

Dual citizenship by region

Africa 
Dual citizenship is allowed in Angola, Burundi, Comoros, Cabo Verde, Côte d'Ivoire, Djibouti, Gabon, Gambia, Ghana, Kenya,Malawi, Mali, Morocco, Mozambique, Niger, Nigeria, Rwanda, Senegal, São Tomé and Príncipe, Sierra Leone, Sudan, Tunisia, Uganda, and Zambia; others restrict or forbid dual citizenship. Lesotho observes dual citizenship, as well as jus soli. There are problems regarding dual citizenship in Namibia. Eritreans, Egyptians, and South Africans wanting to take another citizenship need permission to maintain their citizenship, though multiple citizenship acquired from birth is not affected. Eritrea taxes its citizens worldwide, even if they have never lived in the country. Equatorial Guinea does not allow dual citizenship, but it is allowed for children born abroad, if at least one parent is a citizen of Equatorial Guinea. Tanzania and Cameroon do not allow dual citizenship.

The Americas 
Most countries in the Americas allow dual citizenship, some only for citizens by descent or with other countries, usually also in the region with which they have agreements. Some countries (e.g., Argentina, Bolivia) do not allow their citizens to renounce their citizenship, so they keep it even when naturalizing in a country that forbids dual citizenship. Most countries in the region observe unconditional jus soli, i.e. a child born there is regarded as a citizen even if the parents are not. Some countries, such as the Dominican Republic, Ecuador, Guatemala, Honduras, Mexico, Nicaragua, and Uruguay, allow renunciation of citizenship only if it was involuntarily acquired by birth to non-citizen parents.

Dual citizenship is restricted or forbidden in Cuba, Suriname, Panama, and Guyana.
Colombia's Constitution gives every Colombian the right to have more than one nationality. It does not, however, grant automatic birthright citizenship. To obtain Colombian nationality at birth, a person must have at least one parent who is a national or legal resident of Colombia. A child born outside Colombia who has at least one Colombian parent can be registered as a Colombian national by birth, either upon returning to Colombia (for residents) or at a consulate abroad (for non-residents).
Venezuela allows dual nationality as stated in Article 34 of the Constitution of Venezuela. The only requirement for citizens with dual nationality to enter Venezuelan territory is to present documents proving their Venezuelan nationality (even if they have expired). Venezuelans who possess dual citizenship have the same rights and duties as Venezuelans who do not possess dual citizenship.
United States law does not mention dual nationality or require a person to choose one nationality or another. A U.S. citizen may naturalize in a foreign state without any risk to his or her U.S. citizenship.

Middle East/Asia Pacific 
Most countries in Asia restrict or forbid dual citizenship. In some of these countries (e.g. Iran, North Korea, Kuwait), it is very difficult or even impossible for citizens to renounce their citizenship, even if a citizen is naturalized in another country.

 Australia, Fiji, New Zealand, Philippines, South Korea, Tonga, Vanuatu, and Vietnam allow dual citizenship. Australia's constitution does not permit dual nationals to be elected to the federal Parliament.
Cambodia allows dual citizenship and observes jus soli for children born to legal permanent residents born in Cambodia or to children whose parents are unknown. In 2021 Cambodia banned dual citizenship for prime minister, presidents of the National Assembly, Senate and the Constitutional Council from having dual citizens.
Hong Kong allows dual citizenship for citizens by birth but does not permit applicants for naturalization to retain their prior citizenship. However, there is no such thing as Hong Kong citizenship. The Nationality law of the People's Republic of China (CNL) has been applied in the Hong Kong Special Administrative Region since 1 July 1997. Hong Kong residents who are Chinese citizens holding foreign passports must make a declaration of change of nationality to the HKSAR Immigration Department in order to be regarded as foreign nationals. Foreign nationals or stateless persons can apply for naturalisation as a Chinese national provided that they are Hong Kong residents and meet the requirements under CNL.
South Korea allows any foreign born person meeting income, language, culture, and domicile conditions to become a naturalized citizen. It also allows foreign born nationals who married to a Korean citizen, Korean men holding dual citizenship by birth who served in the Republic of Korea Armed Forces as compulsory military service, Korean women with multiple nationalities by birth who have vowed her intention not to exercise their foreign nationality in the Republic of Korea by the age of 22 and overseas Koreans at least 65 years of age.
Taiwan allows dual citizenship for citizens by birth or for its own citizens but do not permit foreign applicants for naturalization to retain their prior citizenship unless they are senior professionals or have made outstanding contributions to Taiwan. This restriction does not apply to Hong Kong and Macau residents who don't possess a foreign nationality.
Burmese nationality law forbids its citizens to have dual citizenship, and foreigners cannot become naturalized citizens, unless they can prove a close familial connection to the country.
Pakistan restricts dual citizenship (see above), but observes jus soli.
In Papua New Guinea, there was overwhelming support from parliament to amend their Constitution to allow dual citizenship, however the law had yet to come into force .
In the Philippines, Republic Act No. 9225, approved 29 August 2003, provided that natural-born citizens of the Philippines who had lost their Philippine citizenship by reason of their naturalization as citizens of a foreign country would be deemed to have re-acquired Philippine citizenship upon taking an oath of allegiance to the Republic, that their children whether legitimate, illegitimate or adopted, below eighteen years of age, shall be deemed citizens of the Philippines, and that natural born citizens of the Philippines who become citizens of a foreign country subsequent to its enactment would retain their Philippine citizenship upon taking the oath.
Sri Lanka allows dual citizenship. However, under the 19th amendment of that country's constitution, dual citizens are not allowed to hold public office.
Bahrain and Qatar do not allow dual citizenship.
Lebanon allows dual citizenship.
Israel allows dual citizenship except in the case of one being chosen as a member of the Knesset or appointed a government minister, in which case one must relinquish other citizenships when possible.
Iraq allows dual citizenship.
Syria allows dual citizenship.
Kyrgyz Republic allows dual citizenship, but only if a mutual treaty on dual citizenship is in force.
The Indian constitution does not allow voluntary Dual Citizenship. However, in response to persistent demands for dual citizenship, The Overseas Citizenship of India (OCI) scheme was introduced by amending The Citizenship Act, 1955 in August 2005. The older PIO classification was merged with OCI in 2015. However, OCIs do not have the right to vote, stand in an election, get government jobs or invest in farmland (agricultural property).
Japan does not allow dual citizenship. This was upheld in a decision from the Tokyo District Court in January 2021. In 2016, Japanese politician Renhō caused a minor scandal having held both Japan and Republic of China citizenship.

Europe

EU and EFTA countries and microstates 

EU and EFTA countries have varying policies regarding dual citizenship. Under EU rules, a citizen of one EU or EFTA country can live and work indefinitely in the other EU and EFTA countries. However, countries can limit the right to vote and work in certain sensitive fields (such as government, police, military) to local citizens only.
However, an immigrant from another EU or EFTA country can be refused welfare benefits.

Within the EU, mandatory military service exists, at least in peacetime, only in Austria, Cyprus, Estonia, Finland, and Greece (In all countries but Cyprus, alternative service is available). Within the EFTA countries, only Switzerland requires it (alternative service is available); Iceland and Liechtenstein have no armed forces; in Norway, military service is de jure mandatory, but the enforcement is limited, so some sources claim it is de facto voluntary.

EU countries and microstates 
For details, see the nationality law of the country concerned and Citizenship of the European Union.

In Austria, dual citizenship is possible with special permission or if it was obtained at birth. (See also Austrian nationality law)
Belgium allows dual citizenship. (See also Belgian nationality law)
In Bulgaria, Bulgarian citizens of descent can have dual citizenship, but foreigners wanting to naturalize must renounce their old citizenship. (See also Bulgarian nationality law)
Croatia generally allows citizens by descent to have dual citizenship and forbids it only in certain cases, but foreigners wanting to naturalize must renounce their old citizenship. (See also Croatian nationality law)
Cyprus allows dual citizenship. (See also Cypriot nationality law)
Cyprus has been divided into a southern (Greek) and northern (Turkish) region since the Turkish invasion of northern Cyprus on July 20, 1974. Northern Cyprus is not generally recognized by the international community as a sovereign state. The United Nations considers the declaration of independence by Northern Cyprus as legally invalid. The United Nations recognises Northern Cyprus as territory of the Republic of Cyprus under Turkish occupation. Turkey permits Citizens of Northern Cyprus to live and work in Turkey under the same requirements as Turkish citizens, and provides an alien's passport for Northern Cyprus citizens.
The Czech Republic has allowed multiple citizenship since January 1, 2014. (See also Czech nationality law)
Denmark has allowed dual citizenship since September 1, 2015. Note that not all Danish citizens are EU citizens.
The Faroe Islands belong to Denmark, but not the EU, so their inhabitants are Danish citizens, but not EU citizens. Greenland left the EC in 1985, but Greenlanders are considered EU citizens. In practice, citizens of Faroe Islands and Greenland can choose between local and "European" passports and can become "full" EU citizens by moving to and living permanently in Denmark. (See also Danish nationality law)
Estonia forbids dual citizenship, but citizens by descent cannot be deprived of their Estonian citizenship, so they de facto can have dual citizenship. (See also Estonian nationality law)
Finland allows dual citizenship. (See also Finnish nationality law)
France allows dual citizenship. (See also French nationality law)
Germany allows dual citizenship with other EU countries and Switzerland; dual citizenship with other countries is possible with special permission or if obtained at birth; children of non-EU/non-Swiss legal permanent residents can have dual citizenship if born and grown up in Germany (the parents born and grown up abroad must have resided in Germany for at least eight years and must have had the legal-permanent-resident status for at least three years, and usually cannot have dual citizenship themselves). (See also German nationality law)
Greece allows dual citizenship. (See also Greek nationality law)
Hungary allows dual citizenship; grants dual citizenship to people living in, and having ancestors in territories which were annexed from Hungary at the end of World War I, provided they can still speak Hungarian. (See also Hungarian nationality law)
Ireland allows and encourages dual citizenship, but a naturalized citizen can lose Irish citizenship again when naturalized in another country; Ireland was the last European country to abolish unconditional birthright citizenship [in 2004] in order to stop "birth tourism" and to replace it by a modified form: at least one parent must be a citizen or a legal permanent resident. (See also Irish nationality law)
Italy allows dual citizenship. (See also Italian nationality law)
In Latvia, since October 1, 2013 dual citizenship has been allowed for citizens of member countries of the EU, NATO and EFTA [Iceland, Liechtenstein, Norway, Switzerland]; citizens of Australia, Brazil, and New Zealand; citizens of the counties that have mutual recognition of dual citizenship with Latvia; people who were granted the dual citizenship by the Cabinet of Ministers of Latvia; people who have applied for dual citizenship before the previous Latvian Citizenship law [1995]; ethnic Latvians or Livonians who registered Latvian citizenship can keep previous citizenships with any country. (See also Latvian nationality law)
In Lithuania, Article 12 of the Lithuanian Constitution states that only in "individual cases provided for by law" is dual citizenship permitted. [Constitution of the Republic of Lithuania, adopted on Oct. 25, 1992, in force from November 2, 1992]. (See also Lithuanian nationality law)
Luxembourg allows dual citizenship. (See also Luxembourgian nationality law)
Malta allows dual citizenship. (See also Maltese nationality law)
In the Netherlands, dual citizenship is allowed under certain conditions: e.g., foreign citizenship may be kept if obtained at birth or in the event of naturalization via marriage. (See also Dutch nationality law)
Poland does not deal with the issue of dual citizenship, but possession of another citizenship is tolerated since there are no penalties for its possession alone. However, penalties do exist for exercising foreign citizenship, such as identifying oneself to Polish authorities using a foreign identification document. Dual citizens are usually not exempted from their duties as Polish citizens such as entering/leaving Poland using Polish passport or Polish ID card. Under some circumstances, ethnic Poles can apply for the "Polish Card" [Karta Polaka]. (see below) (See also Polish nationality law)
Portugal allows dual citizenship. (See also Portuguese nationality law)
Romania allows dual citizenship. (See also Romanian nationality law)
In Slovakia, dual citizenship is permitted to Slovak citizens who acquire a second citizenship by birth or through marriage; and to foreign nationals who apply for Slovak citizenship and meet the requirements of the Citizenship Act. Please note that after the 'Hungarian-Slovak citizenship conflict' (year 2010) some restrictions to dual citizenship may apply. (See also Slovak nationality law)
Slovenia generally allows citizens by descent to have dual citizenship and forbids it only in certain cases, but foreigners wanting to naturalize must renounce their old citizenship. (See also Slovenian nationality law)
In Spain, Spanish citizens by descent can have dual citizenship; Spanish laws recognize a "dormant citizenship" for citizens naturalizing in Iberoamerican countries. They do not lose their citizenship, but their status and their rights as citizens of Spain—and of the EU—are inactive until they move back to Spain. Foreigners wanting to naturalize in Spain must usually renounce their old citizenship; exceptions are made for citizens of some Iberoamerican countries, Puerto Rico, Andorra, France, the Philippines, Equatorial Guinea, and Portugal. Since 2014, Spain has granted Spanish nationality to Sephardi Jews regardless of nationality. (See also Spanish nationality law)
Sweden allows dual citizenship. (See also Swedish nationality law)
 The four European microstates surrounded by EU countries (Andorra, Monaco, San Marino, and Vatican City) are not EU or EFTA members, and only Vatican City grants (time-limited) dual citizenship (see above). Andorra, Monaco, and San Marino forbid it. In 2015, however, only 21.6% of the inhabitants of Monaco were citizens. See also Andorran nationality law and Monégasque nationality law.

EFTA countries 
Iceland allows dual citizenship. 
Liechtenstein allows citizens by descent to have dual citizenship, but foreigners wanting to naturalize must renounce their old citizenship.
Norway allows dual citizenship. 
Switzerland allows dual citizenship, but the conditions for the naturalization of foreigners vary from canton to canton. Male Swiss citizens under the age of 25, including male dual citizens, are required to perform military or civilian service (women can do it voluntarily), and Swiss citizens (men and women) are not allowed to work for a foreign (non-Swiss) military. Foreign military service is a felony for Swiss citizens (the Swiss Guards of Vatican City are regarded as a "house police", not an army). In the Canton of Schaffhausen, voting is compulsory. For more details, see Swiss nationality law and Schweizer Bürgerrecht (in German).

The Nordic Passport Union 
The Nordic Passport Union allows citizens of Denmark (including the Faroe Islands), Sweden, Norway, Finland and Iceland to travel and reside in other Nordic countries without a passport or a residence permit.

The rest of Europe 
Albania, Belarus, Kosovo,, North Macedonia, Moldova, Russia and Serbia allow dual citizenship, but in Russia a second citizenship must be reported.
Bosnia and Herzegovina has a bilateral agreement on dual citizenship with Serbia, Croatia and Sweden. Montenegro allows dual citizenship with Serbia since 2022.
Ukrainian law currently does not recognise dual citizenship, while not explicitly banning it. Citizens of Ukraine who hold multiple nationalities are only recognized as Ukrainian on Ukrainian soil, and their other citizenships are ignored. In the past, bills to criminalize the act of holding two citizenships in 2014 or to automatically revoke the Ukrainian one upon obtaining another in 2017 have been submitted, but none had been made law. As of 2021, the bill being worked on aims to allow multiple citizenships as long as they are reported and such citizens do not work in governments. Dual citizenships are planned to be fully established with the European Union and, in the context of the annexation of Crimea and the war in Donbas, explicitly forbidden with Russia.
The United Kingdom allows dual citizenship. Note that due to the complexity of the British nationality law, there are different types of British nationality, so not every British national is also a British citizen.

Note

See also 
 Accidental American
 Canadians of convenience
 History of citizenship
 Immigration
 Nationality
 Nationality law
 Naturalization
 Talbot v. Janson
 Tănase v. Moldova
 Third Culture Kid
 World citizenship

References

Further reading 
 
 
 
 Peter J. Spiro (2016). At Home in Two Countries: The Past and Future of Dual Citizenship. New York: NYU Press. .

External links 
 International
 The Hague 1930 Convention
 Convention Nº8 on the Exchange of Information Concerning Acquisition of Nationality, 1964

 Council of Europe
 Convention on the Reduction of Cases of Multiple Nationality and on Military Obligations in Cases of Multiple Nationality, 1963
 European Convention on Nationality, 1997

 
Human migration

de:Staatsbürgerschaft#Mehrfache Staatsbürgerschaft